Urie is both an English and Scottish surname, and a given name. Notable people with the name include:

Surname
Brendon Urie (born 1987), American musician
David Urie, American aerospace engineer
Doug Urie (born 1976), American country musician
Michael Urie (born 1980), American actor
Nicholas Urie (born 1985), American composer 
Robert Urie (1854-1937), Scottish locomotive engineer 
Tom Urie (born 1969), Scottish musician and actor
Peter Urie (born 1956), English TV and Film Producer

Given name
Urie Bronfenbrenner (1917-2005), Russian-born American psychologist
Urie McCleary (1905-1980), American art director

English-language surnames
Scottish surnames